The Port of Key West is a port in Key West, Florida. It includes Key West Bight, Garrison Bight at City Marina, as well as three docks utilized by cruise ships.

History
The first cruise ship to adopt the port was the Sunward in 1969. It docked at Pier B, which was owned at that time by the U.S. Navy. 

In 1984, the city opened a cruise terminal at Mallory Square. The decision was met with opponents who claimed that it would disrupt the tradition of watching the sunset at Mallory Square.

In 2013, a referendum to widen the ship channel was defeated by 73% of voters. The proposal, backed by the Key West Chamber of Commerce, was intended to accommodate larger cruise ships and would have required dredging 17 acres of sea bottom, which includes endangered corals, in the protected Florida Keys National Marine Sanctuary.

In 2020, Key West voters approved three amendments to the City Charter which prohibit large cruise ships, limit daily disembarkations, and prioritize cruise ships with superior public health and environmental records. The amendments, sponsored by the Key West Committee for Safer, Cleaner Ships, passed with 61% to 81% approval.

Services
Cruise ships are serviced by three separate terminals. Mallory Pier is owned and operated by the City of Key West; the Outer Mole Pier is federally owned and operated by the City through a lease agreement with the U.S. Navy; and Pier B is operated by Pier B Development Corporation through a lease agreement with the State of Florida. The city's restrictions on cruise ships apply equally to all three ports. 

A domestic ferry port operates near the Bight of Key West. The port is among the busiest passenger ports in the United States and one of Florida's most important and oldest ferry ports. The port conducts passenger ferry and cruise service to and from Miami, Tampa, Jacksonville, Fort Myers, Port Everglades, Cape Canaveral, and Marco Island, Florida. This allows passengers to travel to Key West without using the busy U.S. 1 Overseas Highway Corridor.

Impacts

Environmental
A United States Environmental Protection Agency (EPA) investigation issued a Finding of No Significant Impact. A proposed plan to dredge the channel was criticized because it would require dredging in the canal and in the surrounding area with possible silting and related damage to sea life, which could affect Key West's seafood industry.

Economy
The cruise ship industry delivers people to the city, where they contribute to the economy by spending at local businesses. This adds about $85 million to business revenues. The port contributes 1,260 jobs. These figures are a significant fraction of the city's economy.

References

Key West, Florida
Key West
Transportation in Key West, Florida